Summer at Carcoar is a 1977 painting by Australian artist Brett Whiteley.  The painting was awarded in the Wynne Prize in 1978, the same year that Whiteley also won the Archibald Prize with Art, Life and the other thing and the Sulman Prize  with Yellow nude - the only artist to be awarded all three prizes in the one year. The painting depicts the landscape around the town of Carcoar, in the Central West of New South Wales.

The work was commissioned by businessman and philanthropist William Bowmore and gifted by him to the Newcastle Art Gallery in 1977. It remains part of its collection and has been described as the institution's "major icon work".

The painting was referenced in the 2019 opera Whiteley, based on the life of the artist.

References

Paintings by Brett Whiteley
Wynne Prize